The 1978 Transamerica Open, also known as the Pacific Coast Championships, was a men's tennis tournament played on indoor carpet courts at the Cow Palace in San Francisco, California in the United States. The event was part of the 1978 Grand Prix circuit and Barry MacKay was the tournament director. It was the 90th edition of the tournament and ran from September 25 through October 2, 1978. The singles event had a field of 64 players. Eighth-seeded John McEnroe won the singles title and $24,000 first prize money.

Finals

Singles
 John McEnroe defeated  Dick Stockton 	2–6, 7–6(7–5), 6–2
 It was McEnroe's 2nd singles title of the year and of his career.

Doubles
 Peter Fleming /  John McEnroe defeated  Bob Lutz /  Stan Smith 5–7, 6–4, 6–4

References

External links
 International Tennis Federation (ITF) tournament details

Pacific Coast International Open
Pacific Coast International Open
Pacific Coast International Open
Pacific Coast International Open
Transamerica Open
Transamerica Open